1946–47 Hong Kong Senior Challenge Shield was the 2nd edition of Hong Kong Challenge Shield after World War II.

Final

References

Hong Kong Challenge Shield
Challenge Shield
Challengge Shield